KPCT-LP (106.7 FM) is a radio station licensed to Parachute, Colorado, United States.  The station is currently owned by State of Colorado Telecommunication Services.

References

External links
 

PCT-LP
PCT-LP